The following Grade I listed buildings in England were constructed after 1901:
 Village College, Impington, Cambridgeshire
 Sir Bernard Lovell Telescope, Jodrell Bank Laboratory, Cheshire
 Ednaston Manor, walls & terracing, Derbyshire
 Castle Drogo, Devon
 Kingsgate Bridge, Durham
 De La Warr Pavilion, Bexhill, East Sussex
 Rodmarton Manor, Gloucestershire
 Severn Bridge & Aust Viaduct (First Severn Crossing), M4 Motorway, Gloucestershire
 Church of St Jude, Hendon, Greater London
 The Free Church, Hendon, Greater London
 The British Museum: King Edward VII Galleries, wall & lions, Camden, Greater London
 Royal College of Physicians, Camden, Greater London
 Nos I, 1a, 1b, 1c And 1d And 2-32 Isokon Flats, Hampstead, Greater London
 Tomb of Karl Marx & family, Highgate Cemetery, Greater London
 27-35 Poultry, London
 Penguin Pool, London Zoo, City Of Westminster
 The Gorilla House, London Zoo, City Of Westminster
 Queen Alexandra Memorial, Westminster
 Statuary group of The Burghers of Calais, Westminster
 Admiralty Arch, Westminster
 Buckingham Palace: forecourt gate piers, gates, railings & lamps, Westminster
 Queen Victoria Memorial, Westminster
 Queen Victoria Memorial: gates And gate piers, balustrades, steps, wall & fountain, Westminster
 The Cenotaph, Whitehall, Westminster
 Isokon Flats, Hampstead, Greater London
 Highpoint I, Hornsey, Greater London
 Highpoint II, Hornsey, Greater London
 Finsbury Health Centre, Greater London
 Royal Festival Hall, Lambeth, Greater London
 Church of All Hallows, Twickenham, Greater London
 Granada, Tooting, Greater London
 Royd House, Altrincham, Greater Manchester
 St James Church, Bramley, Hampshire
 Sandham Memorial Chapel, Burghclere, Hampshire
 Bedales Memorial Library, Lupton Hall And Corridor, Hampshire
 Church of St Andrew, Mottisfont, Hampshire
 Johnston Monument, Gilston Parish Church, Hertfordshire
 22-26 The Cathedral Precincts, Canterbury, Kent
 Christchurch Cathedral, Canterbury: library, Kent
 The Salutation, Sandwich, Kent
 Arch of Remembrance War Memorial, Victoria Park, Leicester
 Royal Liver Building, railings & stone piers, Liverpool
 Roman Catholic Cathedral of St John the Baptist, Norwich
 Temple Of Piety On East Side Of Moon, Studley Royal, North Yorkshire
 Goddards and gateway, terrace & loggia, York
 Church of St Mary the Virgin, Wellingborough, Northamptonshire
 Bell tower & remains of Town Walls, Berwick-upon-Tweed, Northumberland
 Union Suspension Bridge, Berwick-upon-Tweed, Northumberland
 Building D6 At Boots Factory Site, Beeston, Nottinghamshire
 Building D10 At Boots Factory Site, Beeston, Nottinghamshire
 Middleton Park, Oxfordshire
 St Catherine's College, Oxford: Bicycle Store
 St Catherine's College, Oxford: retaining wall
 St Catherine's College, Oxford: master’s house & wall
 St Catherine's College, Oxford: podium & buildings 
 St Catherine's College, Oxford: squash courts
 Willis Faber Building, Ipswich, Suffolk
 Church of St Lawrence, Chobham, Surrey
 Dovecote, Mary Arden's House, Stratford On Avon, Warwickshire
 Cathedral of St Michael, Coventry, West Midlands
 Church of the Epiphany, Leeds, West Yorkshire
 Lloyd's building, City of London
 20 Bedford Square, Greater London

References

Images
 English Heritage Images of England

Modern